Lee Cronin may refer to:

 Lee Cronin (director), Irish film writer and director
 Leroy Cronin, chemist also known as Lee Cronin
 A pen name for Gene L. Coon